Patricia Ann "Paddy" Torsney,  (born December 19, 1962) is a Canadian politician.  She is a former member of the House of Commons of Canada, previously representing the riding of Burlington for the Liberal Party. In 2006, Torsney was defeated by Conservative Party candidate Mike Wallace.

Torsney was educated at McGill University in Montreal, receiving a Bachelor of Commerce degree in 1985.  From 1985 to 1989, she worked as a special assistant to the office of David Peterson, the Liberal Premier of Ontario.  Torsney then worked as a Senior Consultant to the firm of Hill and Knowlton from 1989 to 1993.

Torsney was first elected to parliament in the election of 1993, defeating her closest opponent, Progressive Conservative Mike Kuegle, by almost 10,000 votes.  The Progressive Conservatives had previously held the riding since 1972, under retiring Member of Parliament (MP) Bill Kempling.

The PCs under Jean Charest targeted Burlington in the 1997 election, but Torsney again defeated Kuegle by just over 3,500 votes.  She won an easier victory in the 2000 election, against a more divided opposition.

The newly formed Conservative Party of Canada made a strong bid for the riding in the 2004 election, running local councillor Mike Wallace against Torsney.  Most observers believed that Torsney would lose. However, a last-minute resurgence in Liberal support resulted in a 4,000-vote victory. In the 2006 election, she again faced off against Wallace, losing to him by 2,570 votes. In the 2008 election Torsney lost to Wallace by 9,027 votes.

Torsney was the Parliamentary Secretary to the Minister of the Environment from 1998 to 2000.  On July 20, 2004, she was appointed Parliamentary Secretary to the Minister of International Cooperation.

In 2002, Torsney chaired a committee which recommended several changes to Canada's drug laws, including the decriminalization of small amounts of marijuana.

Torsney was President of Canadian group of the Inter-Parliamentary Union, and has worked for the worldwide abolition of land mines.  She is also a former board member of UNICEF Canada.

In 2007, Liberal Party of Canada Leader, Stéphane Dion, appointed Torsney as Deputy Principal Secretary in the Office of the Leader of the Opposition. She resigned from the position in April 2008.

Electoral record

External links
 How'd They Vote?
 

1962 births
Women members of the House of Commons of Canada
Canadian people of Irish descent
Liberal Party of Canada MPs
Living people
McGill University Faculty of Management alumni
Members of the House of Commons of Canada from Ontario
Members of the King's Privy Council for Canada
People from Burlington, Ontario
Women in Ontario politics
21st-century Canadian politicians
21st-century Canadian women politicians